Novoarkhangelsk may refer to:

 Sitka, Alaska
 Novoarkhanhelsk, an urban-type settlement in Ukraine